Paul John Sifler (born Pavel Gerjol, December 31, 1911, Ljubljana, Slovenia – May 20, 2001, Hollywood, California, was a Slovenian composer and conductor.

Paul J. Sifler was the illegitimate son of the organ builder Ivan Kacin (1884–1953) and a young singer, Terezija Gerjol. His surname was changed to Šifler when he was adopted by his stepfather and was later modified to Sifler. At the age of 11, he moved to the United States from his native Polhov Gradec. He attended the Chicago Conservatory of Music and graduated in 1940 with a degree in music composition. Sifler was an extremely prolific composer, and he is best known for his works for the organ. Many of his other titles, such as his "Slovenian Triptych for Piano" and "Three Preludes on Slovene Church Hymns" relate back his native Slovenia. In 1975, together with Pulitzer Prize-winning composer John La Montaine, Paul Sifler founded Fredonia Press, for the purpose of publishing exclusively the works of the two composers. Until his death in 2001, Sifler lived and worked with La Montaine in Hollywood on Fredonia Drive, from which they derived the name of their publishing company.

Selected works 
 Organ:
 The Despair and Agony of Dachau
 Four Slovene Rhapsodies
 Three Liturgical Preludes
 Prayer for Peace
 Four Nativity Tableaux
 Improvisation on a Joyful Song ("Zdravljica")
 Piano:
 Concerto for Piano and Orchestra
 Three Tall Tales
 The Young Pianist's Almanac
 American Dance Rhapsody
 Martian Suite
 Triptych on Slovenian Folk Songs
 Instrumental:
 Three Miniatures for marimba
 Suite' for marimba dedicated to Karen Pershing
 Sonatina for marimba
 Triptych for Violin and Piano
 Hill Tune and Dance for Flute and Oboe
 Choral:
 Three Puerto Rican Carols for two-part chorus with piano (organ) accompaniment and optional percussion
 On This Night for mixed voices with soprano or tenor solo and optional flute obbligato.
 A Tune I'd Like to Play for You for SATB voices with piano accompaniment.
 Snow is Melting (Sneg kopni) for SATB voices
 Marimba Mass'' for SATB chorus, triangle & marimba

See also 
List of Slovenian composers
Polhov Gradec

References 

Slovenian conductors (music)
Male conductors (music)
1911 births
2001 deaths
Yugoslav emigrants to the United States
Musicians from Ljubljana
20th-century conductors (music)
20th-century male musicians